is a Japanese actor, singer and Media Personality. He was born to English-Japanese parents.

A pivotal figure in Japanese popular music, Mickey is considered one of the three big Japanese names in rock music, helping to popularize the genre in the 1950s where he began as a rockabilly singer. In 1967, he became internationally known for his avant-garde rock band "Mickey Curtis & The Samurai". After five years Mickey disbanded the group and returned to Japan in 1972, where he began producing other musicians.

As an actor his first role was as a rock singer in the 1958 film All About Marriage by Kihachi Okamoto and he has since gone on to star in more than 70 feature films. At over 70 years of age he is one of the oldest major celebrities in Japan and a regular TV personality. Apart from his entertainment career he has also been a race car driver and owns a motorcycle shop in Meguro, Tokyo. He speaks Japanese, English, French, German, Italian and Thai.

Selected filmography

Film

Television

References

External links
 

1938 births
Living people
Japanese male film actors
Japanese people of English descent
Singers from Tokyo